The PNG One Nation Party is a political party in Papua New Guinea.

The party was formed in 2017 by Joseph Tonde.

As of May 2019, the party had one seat in the National Parliament. It is led by Peter Numu, who is its sole MP.

References 

Political parties in Papua New Guinea
2017 establishments in Papua New Guinea
Political parties established in 2017